Erling Walther Sørensen (29 October 1920 – 10 October 2002)  was a Danish amateur football player and club manager, who won a bronze medal with the Denmark national football team at the 1948 Summer Olympics. Sørensen played professionally in the Italian Serie A championship for six years, scoring 48 goals in 169 matches for Italian clubs Modena F.C., Udinese Calcio and U.S. Triestina.

Sørensen was known to have good a technique and a graceful style of playing, thus earning the nickname The Ballet Master. In his civil life, Sørensen worked as a city hall porter, tobacconist and hospital porter.

Honours

Danish Football Championships: 1940-41 and 1943–44 with Frem

References

External links
Danish national team profile
RSSSF - Danish players in Italy at RSSSF

1920 births
2002 deaths
Danish men's footballers
Denmark international footballers
Footballers at the 1948 Summer Olympics
Olympic footballers of Denmark
Olympic bronze medalists for Denmark
Danish expatriate men's footballers
Boldklubben Frem players
RC Strasbourg Alsace players
Modena F.C. players
Udinese Calcio players
U.S. Triestina Calcio 1918 players
Serie A players
Serie B players
Ligue 1 players
Expatriate footballers in Italy
Expatriate footballers in France
Danish football managers
Boldklubben Frem managers
Olympic medalists in football
Medalists at the 1948 Summer Olympics
Association football midfielders
Fremad Amager managers
Footballers from Copenhagen